Uroleptus is a genus of ciliates found in marine environments.

References

Spirotrichea
Ciliate genera